The North Bay Trappers were a Canadian professional ice hockey team in North Bay, Ontario. They played in the Eastern Professional Hockey League in the 1961-62 season.

Results

External links
 The Internet Hockey Database

Ice hockey teams in Ontario
Sport in North Bay, Ontario
Eastern Professional Hockey League (2008–09) teams
Ice hockey clubs established in 1961
Sports clubs disestablished in 1962
1961 establishments in Ontario
1962 disestablishments in Ontario